Köping was a Swedish denomination for a market town since the Middle Ages, derived from the Old Norse word kaupang. The designation was officially abolished with the municipal reform of 1971, when Sweden was subdivided into the Municipalities of Sweden (currently amounting to 290). 

As present-day Finland was once a part of Sweden, the Finnish word kauppala has the same meaning. In modern Finnish, the word kaupunki, borrowed from the Old Norse word kaupang, is the main word for town and city. Swedish köping and the English toponym chipping are also cognates as is the Norwegian word kjøpstad and the Danish toponymical suffix -købing.

Sweden

History 
In 1863 the first local government acts were implemented in Sweden. There were two acts, one for cities and one for rural areas. Of the around 2,500 municipalities, 89 had city rights and thus had the right to call themselves stad (city). Under the "rural" act there were also eight localities given the status of köping, which positioned them between a rural municipality and a town (see municipalköping). The number of localities designated as köping rose dramatically during the 20th century and reached its peak in 1959, when they were 95. Many new settlements during the industrialization of Sweden, as well as some of the suburbs in the metropolitan areas, first received the title of köping and it was also made part of their name (such as Linköping or Nyköping). They later grew further and received town privileges, but kept the köping ending of their names. See the list below.

A large-scale merger of Swedish municipalities in 1971 removed the distinctions between towns, market towns and rural municipalities. Many of the former market towns are now seats of municipalities. In contrast to the term stad, köping is seldom used in everyday speech today.

Toponyms containing the word köping

Municipal Seats

Linköping (104,232 inhabitants)
Jönköping (89,396)
Norrköping (87,247)
Nyköping (29,891)
Lidköping (25,644)
Enköping (21,121)
Köping (17,743)
Falköping (16,350)
Söderköping (6,992)

Minor Localities

Malmköping (1,977)
Köpingsvik (599)
Äsköping (342)

Localities/Parishes in the Diocese of Lund

Löddeköpinge (6,290)
Hököpinge (1,105)
Dalköpinge
Kyrkoköpinge
Sireköpinge
Stora Köpinge

Köping titles issued 1863–1959

See also
Municipalities of Sweden
List of cities in Sweden
Stad (Sweden)
Urban areas of Sweden

References 

 Koping
 
Former subdivisions of Sweden

da:Flække